Marktosis, also spelled Maaqtusiis in the Nuu-chah-nulth language, is one of the principal settlements of the Ahousaht First Nation, located off the west coast of Vancouver Island in British Columbia, Canada, just southeast of the Hesquiat Peninsula on Flores Island. Accessible only by water or air, Marktosis is a small community predominantly composed of First Nations people from the Nuu-chah-nulth nation. Marktosis has approximately 900 residents. 
Marktosis Indian Reserve No. 15 was established around the site of the community and has 622 individuals living on the reserve in 2016.

Early history

Geography
In the neighbourhood is the Clayoquot Sound Biosphere Reserve.

The nearby communities include:
Ahousaht
Opitsaht
Tofino
Ucluelet
Yuquot

See also
Kingfisher

References

BCGNIS entry "Marktosis Indian Reserve 15"

External links
 http://www.nuuchahnulth.org/

Populated places on the British Columbia Coast
Nuu-chah-nulth
Clayoquot Sound region